Kommuri Venugopala Rao was an Indian novelist from Andhra Pradesh. He wrote more than 30 novels. His two novels Penkutillu and House Surgeon are well known to the Telugu readers. He was influenced by Bengali writer Sarath Chandra.

Personal life 
He was born in Vijayawada in the year 1935.

Writings 
He wrote his first novel, Penkutillu, at the age of 15 which was published in 1957. This novel is based on middle class life. House Surgeon is about a steadfast medico. Both of these books received several reprints.

List of Novels 

 Penkutillu
 House Surgeon
 Ee Desamlo Oka Bhagam
 Atma Jyoti
 Gorintaku
 Prema Nakshatram

References 

Telugu writers
Writers from Vijayawada
1935 births
2004 deaths
20th-century Indian novelists
Novelists from Andhra Pradesh